Stadion Miejski w Tychach (English: Municipal Stadium in Tychy) is a football stadium located in Tychy, Poland. It is the home ground of GKS Tychy. The stadium holds 15,300 people.

See also
List of football stadiums in Poland

External links
 Stadion Miejski w Tychach

References

Sports venues completed in 2015
Buildings and structures in Tychy
2015 establishments in Poland
Tychy
Sports venues in Silesian Voivodeship
GKS Tychy